Khalaktyrskoye is a lake on the eastern outskirts of the city Petropavlovsk-Kamchatsky in Kamchatka Krai, Russia. Its main outflow is River Halaktyrka.

External links

Lakes of Kamchatka Krai